Meiju Enho, born in 1981 in Finland, is the former keyboard player of the Finnish Viking/folk metal band Ensiferum. Meiju joined the band in 2001 following the release of their debut album Ensiferum and played on all subsequent releases until her departure in 2007.

Meiju has also performed as a touring musician for Finntroll, another Finnish folk metal band, when their regular keyboard player Trollhorn was unavailable.

It was announced that Meiju had left the Ensiferum on 10 September 2007, in a statement on the band's website. The official announcement read: 

Since 2012, Enho has been the composer, keyboardist, kantele player and lead singer for the Finnish alt/folk metal band Mamyth. In October 2020 joined with Norwegian singer Liv Kristine to Finnish Symphonic Death Metal band Coldbound.

References

External links
 Official Ensiferum website
 https://archive.today/20140706175956/http://www.mamythmusik.com/mamythians
 https://plus.google.com/116707950945669677981/posts

1981 births
Living people
Finnish heavy metal musicians
Finnish keyboardists
Heavy metal keyboardists
Ensiferum members
Women keyboardists
Women in metal